Cai Lậy is a Rural district of Tien Giang province in the Mekong Delta region of Vietnam. As of 2013 the district had a population of 186,583. The district covers an area of 296 km². The district capital lies at Bình Phú Commune. The town of Cai Lậy was separated from the district in 2013.

The town lies on Highway 1A, which links Ho Chi Minh City with the Mekong delta, and is near a continuous ribbon of commercial development.  The hinterland is largely agricultural, with many small holdings specialising in growing a variety of fruits, including custard apples, sweet mango and pomelos in the fertile delta soils.

References

Districts of Tiền Giang province